Enyalioides altotambo, the Alto Tambo woodlizard, is a species of lizards in the family Hoplocercidae. It is endemic to the tropical northwestern Andes in Ecuador. It is named after its type locality, Alto Tambo in the Esmeraldas Province. It differs from its congeneric species by possessing smooth and homogeneous (size) dorsal scales, a brown iris, and lacking circular and keeled scales on its flanks.

References

Enyalioides
Lizards of South America
Reptiles of Ecuador
Endemic fauna of Ecuador
Reptiles described in 2015
Taxa named by Omar Torres-Carvajal
Taxa named by Pablo J. Venegas
Taxa named by Kevin de Queiroz